Gottsch or the accented Göttsch is a surname. Notable people with the surname include:

Mike Gottsch, American football coach
Walter Göttsch (1896–1918), German World War I flying ace